Ormanlı can refer to:

 Ormanlı, Artvin
 Ormanlı, Şenkaya